The 1987 All-Ireland Under-21 Hurling Championship was the 24th staging of the All-Ireland Under-21 Hurling Championship since its establishment by the Gaelic Athletic Association in 1964. The championship began on 12 April 1987 and ended on 21 June 1987.

Galway entered the championship as the defending champions.

On 21 June 1987, Limerick won the championship following a 2-15 to 3-06 defeat of Galway in the All-Ireland final. This was their very first All-Ireland title.

Limerick's Gary Kirby was the championship's top scorer with 1-24.

Results

Leinster Under-21 Hurling Championship

Quarter-finals

Semi-finals

Final

Munster Under-21 Hurling Championship

Quarter-finals

Semi-finals

Final

Ulster Under-21 Hurling Championship

Semi-finals

Final

All-Ireland Under-21 Hurling Championship

Semi-finals

Final

Championship statistics

Top scorers

Top scorers overall

References

Under
All-Ireland Under-21 Hurling Championship